Calochilus russeus, commonly known as the reddish beard orchid, is a species of orchid endemic to the Northern Tablelands of New South Wales. It has a single thick, dark green leaf and up to twelve greenish flowers with red stripes and a hairy labellum which is the largest part of the flower. It is a rare orchid, growing as isolated individuals near Ebor.

Description
Unlike some others in the genus, the leaf is fully developed at flowering time. Individual flowers last for between two and five days. The column has two purple "eyes". Flowering occurs from December to February.

Taxonomy and naming
Calochilus russeus was first formally described in 2004 by David Jones from a specimen collected near the road between Guyra and Ebor and the description was published in The Orchadian. The specific epithet (russeus) is a Latin word meaning "reddish".

Distribution and habitat
The reddish beard orchid grows with bracken, grasses and low shrubs in peppermint forest near Ebor. It occurs as scattered individuals in relatively low numbers, including in Cathedral Rock National Park.

References

russeus
Flora of New South Wales
Endemic orchids of Australia
Plants described in 2004